Elmira Shamilevna Alembekova (Tatar Latin: Elmira Şəmil qızı Əlimbeyova; born 30 June 1990 in Saransk) is a Russian race walker. She won the gold medal in the 20 kilometres walk event at the 2014 European Championships in Athletics.  She continues to be coached by Viktor Chegin, after he has been suspended for a lengthy series of performance-enhancing drug suspensions against many of his athletes.

Doping case
In September 2015 IAAF confirmed that Alembekova was provisionally suspended after a sample from an out-of-competition control in Saransk in June had been found positive for a prohibited substance.

Competition record

References

External links

1990 births
Living people
Russian female racewalkers
People from Saransk
European Athletics Championships medalists
Sportspeople from Mordovia